{{Speciesbox 
| name = Indo-Pacific king mackerel
| image = Scomberomorus guttatus.jpg
| status = DD
| status_system = IUCN3.1
| status_ref = 
| taxon = Scomberomorus guttatus
| authority = (Bloch & Schneider, 1801)
| synonyms = *Cybium crookewitii Bleeker, 1851 Cybium guttatum, (Bloch & Schneider 1801) Cybium interruptum Cuvier 1832 Cybium kuhlii, Cuvier 1832 Indocybium guttatum, (Bloch & Schneider 1801) Scomber guttatus, Bloch & Schneider 1801 Scomber leopardus, Shaw 1803 Scomberomorus crookewiti, (Bleeker 1851) Scomberomorus guttatum, (Bloch & Schneider 1801) Scomberomorus interruptus, (Cuvier 1832) Scomberomorus kuhlii, (Cuvier 1832) Scomberomous guttatum, (Bloch & Schneider 1801) 
}}

Indo-Pacific king mackerel or popularly (spotted) seer fish (Scomberomorus guttatus) is a sea fish among the mackerel variety of fishes. It is found in around the Indian Ocean and adjoining seas. It is a popular game fish, growing up to 45 kg (100 lb), and is a strong fighter that has on occasion been seen to leap out of the water when hooked.

It is popular among the countries of the Indian subcontinent including Bangladesh, India, Pakistan and Sri Lanka.

Seer fish is a delicacy in several regions of India. In Tamil Nadu and Andhra Pradesh, this fish is called "Vanjaram" in Tamil/Telugu as well as "Shermai" among Dakhni people and is usually the costliest variety available. In Maharashtra the fish is called Surmai, while in Goa (in Konkani language) it is called iswan or viswon. In Malabar (North Kerala) it is called Ayakoora where as in South Kerala it is called Ney-meen''. In Karnataka especially in the region of Tulunadu (Dakshina Kannada) they are called Anjal. They can be fried, grilled and made as curry. In addition to being cooked and eaten when fresh, it is also used to make fish pickle, usually eaten as a condiment with rice.

Fisheries

References

External links
 
 

Scombridae
Sport fish
Taxa named by Marcus Elieser Bloch
Taxa named by Johann Gottlob Theaenus Schneider
Fish described in 1801
Scomberomorus